William Danby may refer to:
William Danby (writer)
William Danby (coroner)
William Danby (MP) for Appleby (UK Parliament constituency)